Argyle is an unorganized territory (township) in Penobscot County, Maine, United States. The population was 255 at the 2020 census.

Geography
According to the United States Census Bureau, the unorganized territory has a total area of 26.7 square miles (69.2 km2), all of it land.  It is located by the Penobscot River, to the north of  
Orono and  Old Town.

Notable residents
Solomon Gilman Comstock (1842-1933), was born in Argyle but moved to Minnesota, where he became a U.S. congressman (1889–91).  He died in Moorhead, Minnesota
Philip Foster (1805-1884), noteworthy early pioneer of Oregon.

Demographics

As of the census of 2000, there were 253 people, 95 households, and 64 families residing in the unorganized territory.  The population density was 9.5 people per square mile (3.7/km2).  There were 124 housing units at an average density of 4.6/sq mi (1.8/km2).  The racial makeup of the unorganized territory was 95.65% White, 3.95% Native American and 0.40% Asian.

There were 95 households, out of which 33.7% had children under the age of 18 living with them, 58.9% were married couples living together, 4.2% had a female householder with no husband present, and 32.6% were non-families. 23.2% of all households were made up of individuals, and 4.2% had someone living alone who was 65 years of age or older.  The average household size was 2.66 and the average family size was 3.19.

In the unorganized territory the population was spread out, with 26.1% under the age of 18, 11.9% from 18 to 24, 30.0% from 25 to 44, 22.5% from 45 to 64, and 9.5% who were 65 years of age or older.  The median age was 34 years. For every 100 females, there were 102.4 males.  For every 100 females age 18 and over, there were 105.5 males.

The median income for a household in the unorganized territory was $35,714, and the median income for a family was $43,750. Males had a median income of $27,250 versus $28,750 for females. The per capita income for the unorganized territory was $14,359.  About 5.0% of families and 8.1% of the population were below the poverty line, including 4.3% of those under the age of eighteen and 29.4% of those 65 or over.

References

Unorganized territories in Maine
Populated places in Penobscot County, Maine